There are at least 21 named lakes and reservoirs in Pope County, Arkansas.

Lakes
Flagg Lake, el.  
Holla Bend, el.  
Lodge Lake, el.  
Long Lake, el.

Reservoirs
Galla Creek Lake, el.  
Galla Creek Wildlife Lake, el.  
Galla Watershed Site One Reservoir, el.  
Jones Lake, el.  
Lake Atkins, el.  
Lake Irvin, el.  
Lake Russellville, el.  
Lake Vinson, el.  
Lake Yarbrough, el.  
West Fork Point Remove Creek Site 10 Reservoir, el.  
West Fork Point Remove Creek Site 11 Reservoir, el.  
West Fork Point Remove Creek Site 17 Reservoir, el.  
West Fork Point Remove Creek Site 18 Reservoir, el.  
West Fork Point Remove Creek Site 19 Reservoir, el.  
West Fork Point Remove Creek Site Eight Reservoir, el.  
West Fork Point Remove Creek Site Nine Reservoir, el.  
Winthrop Rockefeller Lake, el.

See also
 List of lakes in Arkansas

Notes

Bodies of water of Pope County, Arkansas
Pope